Against the Light is the ninth studio album by Singaporean singer Stefanie Sun, released on 22 March 2007 by Capitol Music Taiwan. The album earned an IFPI Hong Kong Top Sales Music Award for Top 10 Best Selling Mandarin Albums of the Year in 2007.

Track listing
 "In the Beginning"
 "逆光" (Against the Light)
 "夢游" (Sleep-Walking)
 "咕嘰咕嘰" (Muttering)
 "我懷念的" (What I Miss) 
 "安寧" (Tranquility)
 "飄著" (Floating)
 "愛情的花樣" (Pattern of Love)
 "漩渦" (Swirl)
 "需要你" (Needing You)
 "關於" (About)
 "Afterward"

References

2007 albums
Stefanie Sun albums